Yoda Fountain is a fountain with a bronze statue of the Star Wars character Yoda, installed at the Lucasfilm offices in the Letterman Digital Arts Center in San Francisco, California, United States.

References

Bronze sculptures in California
Fountains in California
Outdoor sculptures in San Francisco
Statues in San Francisco
Statues of fictional characters
Works based on Star Wars